Merangi is a village Jiyyammavalasa mandal in Parvathipuram Manyam district of Andhra Pradesh, India. There is a post office at Merangi. The PIN code is 535 526.

Demographics
 Indian census, the demographic details of Chinamerangi village is as follows:
 Total Population: 	4,452 in 1,030 Households
 Male Population: 	2,282 and Female Population: 	2,170
 Children Under 6-years of age: 587 (Boys -	307 and Girls -	280)
 Total Literates: 	2,136

References

Villages in Parvathipuram Manyam district